Francisco Vicente Assis (born 25 December 1974) is an Angolan footballer. He played in 13 matches for the Angola national football team from 1997 to 1999. He was also named in Angola's squad for the 1998 African Cup of Nations tournament.

References

External links
 

1974 births
Living people
Angolan footballers
Angola international footballers
1998 African Cup of Nations players
Place of birth missing (living people)
Association football midfielders
C.D. Primeiro de Agosto players